The Chiojdeanca is a right tributary of the river Cricovul Sărat in Romania. It flows into the Cricovul Sărat in Apostolache.

References

Rivers of Romania
Rivers of Prahova County